Pentafluorothiophenol is an organosulfur compound with the formula C6F5SH.  It is a colorless volatile liquid.  The compound is prepared by the reaction of sodium hydrosulfide and hexafluorobenzene.  With a pKa of 2.68, it is one of the most acidic thiols.  Its conjugate base has been used as a ligand in coordination chemistry

Related compounds
 Pentafluorophenol

References

Thiols
Fluoroarenes
Foul-smelling chemicals